Wandrahm was German a cargo ship built in 1927. She was requisitioned by the Kriegsmarine during the Second World War, serving as Schiff 4, V 1801 Wandrahm and V 6114 Eismeer. Post-war, she was allocated to the Soviet Union. Renamed Onega, she was used as a factory ship. She was on the shipping registers until 1969.

Description
The engine was built by Stettiner Oderwerke, Stettin, Germany.

History
Wandrahm was built in 1927 as yard number 735 by Stettiner Oderwerke for H. M. Gehrckens, Hamburg, Germany. She was launched on 29 November 1927. The Code Letters RGLV were allocated. In 1934, her Code Letters were changed to DHZK.

On 30 September 1939, Wandrahm was requisitioned by the Kriegsmarine. She was designated "Schiff 4" and allocated to 5 Vorpostengruppe. The vorpostengruppe was disbanded on 22 May 1940 and she was reallocated to 18 Vorpostenflotille, serving as V 1801 Wandrahm. On 31 August 1940, she was reallocated to 61 Vorpostenflotille, serving as V 6114 Eismeer.

Eismeer was allocated to the Soviet Union post-war as part of the war reparations. She was renamed Onega (Онега). She was used as a factory ship based in Murmansk. She collected fish from trawlers and processed it before delivery to port. It was found that her hold capacity was too small compared to Liberty ships also used in that role. Therefore, Onega was rebuilt to increase her hold capacity. Withdrawn from service in 1964, she was mentioned in an accident report in 1965, and was still on the shipping registers in 1969.

External links
Photograph of Onega
 Photograph of Onega

References

1927 ships
Ships built in Stettin
Steamships of Germany
Merchant ships of Germany
World War II merchant ships of Germany
Auxiliary ships of the Kriegsmarine
Steamships of the Soviet Union
Merchant ships of the Soviet Union